New Technology Management Inc. (NTMI) is a supplier of border surveillance technology now in use at land border ports of entry (POEs) throughout the United States.

Corporate history
Former educator Lurita Doan founded NTMI in 1990.  Amongst Doan's first customers was Business Executives for National Security (BENS).  NTMI's successful bid for a $250,000 Navy contract in 1993 allowed Doan to hire her first three employees. In 2005, Doan sold her firm for an undisclosed sum to a group of investors to pursue a political appointment with the Bush administration.  NTMI's new president is Jack Larmer.

From these modest beginnings, NTMI has grown to become a major supplier of technology products and services to government agencies such as the U.S. Army, U.S. Air Force, U.S. Navy, U.S. Department of the Treasury, U.S. Customs Service, U.S. Immigration and Naturalization Service(INS) and the U.S. Department of Homeland Security.  NTMI's products and services focus on three primary areas: Security, mobile computing and enterprise software application development

NTMI has completed systems that provide information to border workers at more than 200 ports of entry and has unrolled a next-generation border patrol system in seven locations in Arizona, which it is expanding to other states. This advanced system incorporates video surveillance of everyone passing through the entry ports, digital records of all cars entering and leaving the United States, and knowledge management-based targeting systems that "concentrate attention to the most likely threats" using criminal data from the FBI, INS, local law enforcements and even the Mexican government.

References

Manufacturing companies based in Virginia
Technology companies of the United States
Science and technology in Virginia
Technology companies established in 1990
1990 establishments in Virginia